Cemşir Muratoğlu (born 10 July 1959) is a Turkish soccer coach, and a former assistant coach at Beşiktaş JK, Altay SK, Konyaspor, UAE National Team, Al Wahda (Saudi Arabia), Al Nassr (Saudi Arabia), Fenerbahçe SK, Trabzonspor head coach at Kastamonuspor, UAE National Team U-17, Bilecikspor, Yıldırım Bosnaspor, Thy SK, Vanspor, Al Shaab Club (Youth Development).

Playing career

 1976-80: Yıldırım Bosna F.C. (amateur)
 1989/90: Bilecikspor F.C. player/coach (Professional 3.League Turkey)

Work with National Teams

 1995/96: U.A.E National Team Under 17
 1996: U.A.E National First Team assistant coach

Club career

 1985/86: F.C. Beşiktaş (Turkish Super League) assistant coach
 1986/87: F.C. Beşiktaş (Turkish Super League) assistant coach
 1987/88: F.C. Altay (Turkish Super League) assistant coach
 1988/89: F.C. Konyaspor (Turkish Super League) assistant coach
 1990/91: F.C. Bilecikspor (Third Turkish League) head coach
 1991/92: F.C. Kastamonuspor (Third Turkish League) head coach
 1992/93: F.C. Bilecikspor (Third Turkish League) head coach
 1993/94: F.C. Yıldırım Bosna (Second Turkish League) head coach for all categories
 1994/95: F.C. Fenerbahçe (Turkish Super League) assistant coach
 1995/96: U.A.E. National Football Team U-17 head coach
 1995/96: U.A.E. National Football Team assistant coach
 1997/98: F.C. Fenerbahçe (Turkish Super League( assistant coach
 1999/00: F.C. Yıldırım Bosna (Second Turkish League) supervisor of all categories
 2002/03: Al-Wehda F.C. (Second Saudi Arabian League) head coach
 2003/04: F.C. Yıldırım Bosna (Second Turkish League) supervisor of all categories
 2004/05: Al Nasser F.C. (First Saudi Arabian League) assistant coach
 2004/05: Darıca Gençlerbirliği (Second Turkish League) head coach
 2005/06: F.C. Trabzonspor (Turkish Super League) assistant coach
 2008/09: F.C. Alibeyköyspor (Second Turkish League) head coach
 2009/10/11: F.C. Turkish Airlines (Turkish Super Amateur League, İstanbul) head coach
 2012/Continues: Al Shaab Club (United Arab Emirates) head coach of youth development

Notable achievements

 Placed third with UAE U-17 at the Asian games (head coach)
 Turkish Super League Champion with Beşiktaş JK in 1985-1986 season (assistant coach)
 Placed second with UAE National first team at 1996 Asian Football Cup (assistant coach)
 Promoted to the Saudi Arabian first league with Al-Wahda FC (Mecca)
 Turkish Prime Minister Cup Winner with Fenerbahçe SK (head coach)
 Yıldırım Bosna SK. Istanbul Champion with youth team
 League Champion with Fenerbahçe PAF team (director of youth development)

References

1959 births
Living people
Turkish football managers
Fenerbahçe football managers
Turkish expatriate football managers